Audrey was a small steam vessel that operated on Puget Sound in the early part of the 1900s.  The vessel was converted to a diesel tug and operated as such for many years on Puget Sound.

Career
Built in 1909, Audrey was used to replace the steamer Crystal on the run from Tacoma to Wollochet Bay in southern Puget Sound.  She later served as a grocery carrier for the small south Puget Sound communities of Still Harbor, Anderson Island, Longbranch, and North Bay. Audrey was later converted to a diesel-powered tug.  Audrey was used by the Seattle police to locate the body of the victim in a case known as the Mahoney Trunk Murder. In 1943, she was sold to Delta V. Smyth, and in 1960, went to the Foss tug concern with all other Smyth tugs.

Notes

External links 
 

Propeller-driven steamboats of Washington (state)
Steamboats of Washington (state)
Tugboats of the United States
1909 ships